Esmaeil Farhadi (born July 26, 1982, Iran) is an Iranian football player who currently plays for Gostaresh Foulad  in Persian Gulf Pro League.

Club career
Farhadi played for Zob Ahan in the 2010 AFC Champions League group stage.

Club career statistics

 Assist Goals

Honours

Club
Zob Ahan
Hazfi Cup (2): 2008–09, 2014–15
Iran Pro League Runner-up: 2008–09, 2009–10
AFC Champions League Runner-up: 2010

Individual
Iran's Premier Football League
2008/09 Top Goalassistant with 9 assists, shared with Mohammad Reza Khalatbari and Ivan Petrović, Zob Ahan

References

Iranian footballers
Association football forwards
Zob Ahan Esfahan F.C. players
Giti Pasand players
Persian Gulf Pro League players
Azadegan League players
Sportspeople from Isfahan
1982 births
Living people